Ingleside is an unincorporated community in Adams County, Nebraska, United States.

History
A post office was established at Ingleside in 1905, and remained in operation until it was discontinued in 1972. Ingleside is a name meaning "fireside". It was also listed as the location of the Ingleside Hospital for the Insane (later named the Hastings State Hospital).

References

Unincorporated communities in Adams County, Nebraska
Unincorporated communities in Nebraska